Yamasato-ohike  is an earthfill dam located in Mie Prefecture in Japan. The dam is used for irrigation. The catchment area of the dam is 0.4 km2. The dam impounds about   ha of land when full and can store 130 thousand cubic meters of water.

See also
List of dams in Japan

References

Dams in Mie Prefecture